Al Hai may refer to:
Al Hai, Iran
Al Hai, alternate name of Alavi, Khuzestan, Iran
Al-Hai District, Iraq